Museo Antropologico y de Arte Contemporaneo (English: "Anthropology and Contemporary Art Museum"), or MAAC is a state-of-the-art museum in Guayaquil, Ecuador celebrating Ecuadorian, Latin American and Pre-Columbian art and culture. MAAC is a welcome addition to Malecón 2000, the renovated riverwalk in Guayaquil.  Inaugurated on 30 July 2003, MAAC aims to constitute itself in a catalyst for the development of the local, regional and national artistic culture.

MAAC's mission is to harness the institutional cultural patrimony, by showcasing a valuable collection of 50,000 native Ecuadorian archaeological pieces and over 3,000 modern works of art.

The MAAC offers many integrated programs that include exhibitions, conferences, round tables, factories, projections of cinema, scenic arts, through which it aims to fulfill the challenges of putting the cultural patrimony to the service of the development of the Country and to help in cultural education of the community, on the base of a permanent interchange, stimulating the critical conscience of a diverse community.

Past exhibitions

 2004–2005 — Sala Autoral, Enrique Tábara
 2005 - Sala Autoral, Peter Mussfeldt
 2006 — Sala Autoral, Judith Gutierrez
 2006 — Sala Autoral, Estuardo Maldonado
 2006 — Sala Autoral, Galo Moncayo-Asan
 2007 - Sala Autoral, Oswaldo Viteri
 2007 - CausalityLabs, CausalityLabs
 2008 - Sala Autoral, Juan Villafuerte

See also
Pre-Columbian Ecuador

External links
 MAAC official website
 Museum and Virtual Library (Museums of Central Bank of Ecuador) english

Museo Antropologico y de Arte Contemporaneo
Museums in Ecuador
Modern art museums
Buildings and structures in Guayaquil
Art museums established in 2003
Museo Antropologico y de Arte Contemporaneo
Museo Antropologico y de Arte Contemporaneo